Damel Flowers (born 28 October 1960) is a Belizean sprinter. He competed in the men's 200 metres at the 1984 Summer Olympics.

References

1960 births
Living people
Athletes (track and field) at the 1984 Summer Olympics
Athletes (track and field) at the 1987 Pan American Games
Belizean male sprinters
Olympic athletes of Belize
Pan American Games competitors for Belize
Place of birth missing (living people)